A Sister of Six (German title: Die sieben Töchter der Frau Gyurkovics, Swedish title: Flickorna Gyurkovics) is a 1926 silent romantic comedy film directed by Ragnar Hyltén-Cavallius and starring Willy Fritsch, Betty Balfour and Lydia Potechina. It was a co-production between Germany, Sweden and the United Kingdom. It was shot at the Tempelhof Studios in Berlin. The film's sets were designed by the Swedish art director Vilhelm Bryde.

Cast
 Willy Fritsch as Count Horkay  
 Betty Balfour as Mizzi 
 Anna-Lisa Ryding as Katinka  
 Lydia Potechina as Mrs. Gyurkovics  
 Ivan Hedqvist as Colonel von Radvanyi  
 Werner Fuetterer as Geza 
 Karin Swanström as Countess Emilie Hohenstein  
 Stina Berg as Countess Aurore Hohenstein  
 Gunnar Unger as Lt. Semessey 
 Axel Hultman as Captain Erdogy  
 Tita Christescu 
 Olga Engl 
 Harry Halm 
 Helene Hedin 
 Anny Hintze
 Ruth Oberbörsch
 Sophie Pagay
 Gretl Schubert 
 Elza Temary 
 Truus Van Aalten 
 Camilla von Hollay
 Iwa Wanja

References

Bibliography
 Low, Rachael. History of the British Film, 1918-1929. George Allen & Unwin, 1971.

External links

1926 films
1926 romantic comedy films
British romantic comedy films
German romantic comedy films
Films of the Weimar Republic
British silent feature films
German silent feature films
Swedish silent feature films
Films directed by Ragnar Hyltén-Cavallius
Films based on works by Ferenc Herczeg
Films set in Hungary
German black-and-white films
Films shot at Tempelhof Studios
1920s British films
Silent romantic comedy films
1920s German films